The 2016 PRO Rugby season was the inaugural and only season of the PRO Rugby, contested by teams from the United States. The season ran from April to July 2016. This was the first season of professional rugby union in North America.

PRO Rugby contracted 102 players for its five teams. Of these 102 players, 54 have played international rugby, including 36 for the United States national rugby union team. About 30 players were picked from Pacific Rugby Premiership teams and 15 from Midwest Rugby Premiership teams.

Competition format
Each team played a twelve match schedule with six matches at home and six away. Most matches took place on Sunday to give clubs and schools the chance to play on Saturday and Friday.

The league had a lighter schedule on June 5 and 12 (the 12th being during the three-week June international window). Those days had just one match. There was however a full slate on June 19 and 26 (both during the international window) and teams lost players to the United States, Canadian or other national teams during this time.

Broadcasting
Matches were available for the 2016 inaugural season to stream through prorugby.org or on cable through ONE World Sports or Time Warner Cable Sports Channel. Initially selected matches were available free to all online through www.aol.com but this came to an inexplicable abrupt end. Through the league's official website all matches were streamed free to all viewers. ONE World Sports was offered by multiple cable and satellite providers and covered a range of sports, most notably a large selection of soccer.

Teams and officials

Match officials
PRO Rugby named the following five referees and three assistant referees to handle the regular-season games for the 2016 season.

Referees
 Leah Berard
 Scott Green
 Nick Ricono
 Derek Summers
 Kurt Weaver

Assistant referees
 Jamie Miller
 Marc Nelson
 George O'Neil

Standings

Ladder progression

Players
Note: Flags to the left of player names indicate national team as has been defined under World Rugby eligibility rules, or primary nationality for players who have not yet earned international senior caps.

Top points scorers

Top try scorers

Updated: July 31, 2016

Overall points scorers

Updated: September 6, 2016

Team of the season
The following shows the team of the season, as selected by various media outlets.

Player development
The following list shows PRO Rugby players who earned their debut cap for the U.S. national rugby team during the 2016 season:
 Angus MacLellan (June 25 vs Canada)
 Langilangi Haupeakui (June 25 vs Canada)

Attendance

By team
These are the attendance records of each of the teams at the end of the home and away season. The table does not include finals series attendances.

By week

Regular season

Week 1

Week 2

Week 3

Week 4

Week 5

Week 6

Week 7

Week 8

Week 9

Week 10

Week 11

Week 12

Week 13

Week 14

Week 15

Week 16

Season transfers

Denver Stampede

Ohio Aviators

Sacramento Express

San Diego Breakers

San Francisco Rush

Notes

References

External links
 

 
Season
2016 in American rugby union
2016 rugby union tournaments for clubs